A centered pentagonal number is a centered figurate number that represents a pentagon with a dot in the center and all other dots surrounding the center in successive pentagonal layers. The centered pentagonal number for n is given by the formula 

The first few centered pentagonal numbers are

1, 6, 16, 31, 51, 76,
106, 141, 181, 226, 276,
331, 391, 456, 526, 601,
681, 766, 856, 951, 1051, 1156, 1266, 1381, 1501, 1626, 1756, 1891, 2031, 2176, 2326, 2481, 2641, 2806, 2976 .

Properties
The parity of centered pentagonal numbers follows the pattern odd-even-even-odd, and in base 10 the units follow the pattern 1-6-6-1.
Centered pentagonal numbers follow the following Recurrence relations:

Centered pentagonal numbers can be expressed using Triangular Numbers:

See also
Pentagonal number
Polygonal number
Centered polygonal number

External links

Figurate numbers